Kiran Uniyal is an Indian martial artist, educator, and author.

Early life 
Uniyal first got involved with Taekwondo when she was a teenager, and then picked it up again as an adult.

Career 
She is the first Indian woman to set 34 martial arts speed records for elbow strikes and kicks. She is also the female record holder for most full contact punch strikes in one hour, at 28,234 strikes. 

According to Guinness World Records, on 9 April 2022, she made 590 full contact punch strike with 1 kilogram weights in one minute, and also on April 23, 2022 she made 579 full contact elbow strikes (single elbow) in three minutes. Earlier Uniyal has set records in the women's category for most full contact knee strikes in one minute with 120 strikes and full contact knee strikes in three minutes (one leg) with 263 strikes.  She holds the Guinness World Record for the most full-contact elbow strikes in ones hand in three minutes, with 466 strikes.

On Army Day 2017, Uniyal took part the organising of a blood donation camp that collected 3,704 blood units.

Uniyal has started the Know Your Martyrs Families campaign to increase awareness of the families of martyrs. She is the co-author of the book Empowering Divyangjan: A Compendium of Benefits and Facilities for the Differently Abled Children of the Armed Forces.

Family life 
Uniyal is a married mother of two children.

References

External links 

 
 

Living people
1973 births
Indian female athletes
World record holders
Women from Uttarakhand
Indian martial artists

Indian female taekwondo practitioners